Dundrum Town Centre is a shopping centre located in Dundrum, Dublin, Ireland. It is Ireland's largest shopping centre with over 169 tenants, almost  of floor space, and over 3,400 car parking spaces. It is located just south of the village centre of Dundrum.

History
Dundrum Town Centre was built on the site of the former Pye television factory, later the site of an entertainment and bowling centre called Dundrum Bowl.  In 1993, the Dundrum Bowl was closed due to flooding.

The shopping centre was opened on 3 March 2005. Over 5,000 people queued in the main square. Within 3 years, over 70 million people visited Dundrum Town Centre.

The centre has been extended in phases and is divided into various districts.  It is divided into areas its management labels "districts" - the "Gallery", located in the main building, "Pembroke", around the Mill Pond feature, and "Dundrum South", located outside the main Tesco overground car park.

In July 2016, the UK commercial property firm Hammerson bought control of Dundrum from Allianz for a reported £1.01 billion, and will own it jointly with Allianz Real Estate.

2011 flood 
Dundrum Town Centre was evacuated shortly before 8pm on 24 October 2011 after floodwaters surged through the doors. The owner of a Mexican restaurant in the complex said five feet of water had rushed down steps towards his business, causing thousands of euro worth of damage.

Name
"Dundrum Town Centre" was originally a local government term, defined by Dún Laoghaire–Rathdown County Council, before the shopping centre was built.  It was described as "the area between the Luas line, the Dundrum Relief Road, the Taney Road / Upper Churchtown Road junction, and the Wyckham By-Pass Route. It is mainly zoned for "town centre" uses, but with some parts zoned residential."  The shopping centre was built under the provisions of the Urban Structure Plan for the Dundrum Town Centre zone.

The name Dundrum Shopping Centre referred to an older, smaller, shopping centre off Main Street in Dundrum, which is still open, and home to Lidl, Dealz, Mulveys of Dundrum. Following many years of decay, efforts have been made to revamp this area and it is now known as Dundrum Village Centre.

Tenants
Dundrum Town Centre contains a range of retail, restaurant and entertainment tenants. Retail stores include Tesco Ireland, Marks and Spencer, H&M, Next, Harvey Nichols, Gap, Hollister Co., Penney's, JD Sports and Zara. Entertainment includes a Movies@ cinema and Mill Theatre Dundrum. A temporary ice-skating rink is operational during some of the Winter months to host ‘Dundrum on Ice’, which starts in October.

Public transport
The centre is served by the Luas green line, the closest stop is Balally but it is also close to Dundrum stop. It is also served by Dublin Bus routes 14, 44, and 44b and Go-Ahead Ireland routes 75 and 175.

Media

Dublin South FM 93.9 is a local BAI-licensed community based radio station for South Dublin. It started broadcasting in 1995 from the old PYE centre, and also broadcast from Rathfarnham. It now broadcasts from purpose-built new studios in the Dundrum Town Centre. About 60 volunteers produce and broadcast 35 hours of programmes each week. Transition Year students from local schools also get involved, as well as media students.

Communicorp also have a studio in Dundrum Town Centre with 98fm, SPIN 1038, NewsTalk and Today FM regularly broadcasting from it. Today FM's Phil Cawley presents a show from the centre every Sunday from 1–4.

An in-house television channel, "Dundrum Television", was launched by RTÉ in 2005, and used to broadcast advertising and other programming.

Awards
In 2011, Dundrum Town Centre was awarded the county's first Ecocert certification.

By the end of 2009, Dundrum Town Centre had won 30 national and international awards since opening.

In 2009, Dundrum Town Centre was awarded "Shopping Centre of the Year" for the third year running at the FBD Retail Excellence Awards, as voted by shopping centre retailers throughout Ireland.

On 27 April 2007, Dundrum Town Centre was named as the ICSC (International Council of Shopping Centres) European Shopping Centre of the year for 2007 at their European conference in Warsaw. Shopping Centres throughout Europe were visited and judged as part of a rigorous adjudication system, which had as its criteria: Tenant Mix, Community Integration, Vision, Customer Service Ethos, Management Systems and Sustainability. From an initial list of 24, a short list of 3 was made, from which Dundrum was chosen.

References

Dundrum
Dundrum, Dublin
Buildings and structures in Dún Laoghaire–Rathdown
Shopping malls established in 2005
2005 establishments in Ireland
21st-century architecture in the Republic of Ireland